Cafe R&B is a five-piece band from the Los Angeles area consisting of female singer Roach, guitarist Byl Carruthers, keyboardists John "JT" Thomas, Harry Cohen and Stevie Utstein, bassist Bobby Pickett, and drummers Don Swanson and Adam Gust.

Longtime music fans may remember lead singer "Roach" from her days fronting Los Angeles' "Roach and the White Boys" in the early 1980s. Critics in the U.S. and Europe have compared her hard-rocking vocals to the likes of Etta James, Tina Turner and Aretha Franklin. HITS Magazine declared: "Imagine Etta James riding a Harley out of an active volcano, and you'll have some vague inkling as to the vocal power..." Her producer/husband, Byl Carruthers, does amazing guitar work and writes the band's original material. When not producing music, he also produces and directs television shows – his credits include "Oprah," "Spy TV," and others. He's also known as a walking encyclopedia of the blues, and has written liner notes for several blues compilations.

Cafe R&B has passion for gritty, hard-hitting early blues and R&B. For the past ten years, Cafe R&B has honed their legendary live performance skills at venues and blues clubs throughout the U.S., such as the House of Blues and "Buddy Guy's Legends," the legendary San Francisco Blues Festival in 2005, Fire on the Mountain Blues Festival in '05, 06, and '07, and the Long Beach Blues Festival, Chicago Blues Festival 2010 just to name a few. In Europe, they have performed at jam-packed and sold-out residences in London, Barcelona and Paris. In May 2010 they headlined the 19.Grolsch Blues Festival in Schoeppingen/Germany and the Jazz Festival in Cloppenburg/Germany.
In October 2009, 2010 and 2012 they performed on the Legendary Rhythm & Blues Cruise. Byl Carruthers died in early May 2022.

Selected discography 

https://web.archive.org/web/20071206041707/http://www.eastbayexpress.com/music/rebirth_of_the_blues/Content?oid=285943

References

External links 
Cafe R&B website
Café R&B Scorches One Colorado Friday

Musical groups from Los Angeles
Rock music groups from California
American soul musical groups